Carlos Manuel Chávez (born 25 December 1931) is a cardiovascular and thoracic surgeon best known for his participation in the first-ever human heart transplant.  He was also the first surgeon to perform a coronary artery bypass, during 1972 in Mississippi, United States, and Monterrey, Mexico.

Chavez was born in Cajamarca, Peru.  He was the last of nine children born to Nazario Chávez Aliaga (1891–1979). He graduated from the Universidad Nacional Mayor de San Marcos, Lima, Peru in the late 1950s and moved to the United States where he finished his training in Cardiothoracic surgery at the University of Mississippi Medical Center and completed his residency in 1961.

As a young doctor in 1962, Chavez went to the University of Mississippi Medical Center in Jackson for post-graduate training in cardiovascular medicine.  "The thrust of research at that time was going toward transplantation," he said.

Heart Transplant
Transplant research began at the University of Mississippi Medical Center’s labs in 1956, investigating operative techniques, organ storage and preservation, post-operative management and other problems.

Chavez visited leading medical centers around the country to learn from their trials and errors, and determine which animals could potentially be the best donors.  A donated human heart would have been almost unthinkable at that time.

By the spring of 1963, the doctors began cautiously planning for a heart transplant. On January 22, 1964 a 68-year-old man was admitted to the hospital in a coma with no detectable blood pressure... thus his life expectancy was measured in hours.

A potential donor was a man with severe brain injury, his breathing supported by a ventilator.  Doctors were reluctant, however, to remove from life support because his blood pressure was stable, so an alternate donor was found; a chimpanzee.

Chavez said his prior research showed chimps’ and baboons’ blood types most closely matched humans’.  The procedure took place on January 23, and for a short time, the transplanted heart beat normally  But by one hour after the cardiopulmonary bypass machine was removed, two hours following the removal of the clamps; effective blood pressure could no longer be maintained.

"The body went into acute rejection of the heart," Chavez said.

Only a few anti-rejection medicines were available to doctors at that time.  The doctors surmised the heart may have been too small and that the patient too weak before surgery for the transplant to take place.

But Chavez and his mentor, James D. Hardy, M.D., had proven heart transplantation in humans could be done. Their effort was overshadowed in history by the more noteworthy first human-to-human heart transplant by Christiaan Barnard, M.D. in Cape Town, South Africa, in 1967. The American Medical Association, and its convention in New York City, presented Chavez with a Scientific Award silver medal for his exhibit on transplantation in 1965.  He also received an Honor Achievement Award from the Angiology Research foundation in 1968.

Chavez forsook private practicing for a while, and devoted his energies to teaching.  He had served as chief instructor of anatomy and professor of surgery in his native Lima, Peru.

Private life
After about 15 years of teaching in Jackson, he began to yearn for private practice.  “The only opportunity left for me (at the University of Mississippi) was department chairman, held by Dr. Hardy.  It didn’t seem as though he would be stepping down any time soon.”

At about the same time, a friend who was practicing in Lubbock, Texas, began calling Chavez to recruit him.  The surgeon moved his family to Lubbock in 1978, worked at his practice, and also joined the faculty at Texas Tech University.

In 1982, Chavez moved again, this time to Brownsville, Texas and remains active in medicine, although has not performed any transplant work in recent years.

References

Peruvian surgeons
1931 births
Living people
People from Brownsville, Texas
Texas Tech University faculty
National University of San Marcos alumni